"Owata" is the second single from The Smashing Pumpkins' aborted music project, Teargarden by Kaleidyscope, and tenth song released from the project.

History
The song has a fairly long history prior to its official release. The song was performed, for the first time, on The Chris Isaak Hour on April 4, 2009, when Jimmy Chamberlin was still in the band. Subsequently, it was performed throughout 2009 with Billy Corgan's Sky Saxon-inspired supergroup, Spirits in the Sky, which featured future Smashing Pumpkins drummer Mike Byrne. As well, the song was performed with the Smashing Pumpkins throughout 2010, prior to its official release on Teargarden by Kaleidyscope. These early live versions are considerably different musically than the final studio version, with the studio version featuring a different drum arrangement, and a noticeably larger amount of synthesizers.

Music video
A 12-minute short film featuring an in-depth look at two female underground wrestlers was released in July, 2011. The video was directed by Robby Starbuck and stars Shelly Martinez, Raven and Alissa Flash, which was subsequently edited and released in a traditional music video format. It was the first-ever video to be filmed with Red Digital Cinema Camera Company technology.

Critical reception
One Thirty BPM rated "Owata" 5/10, calling it "a sleekly produced pop-rocker characterized by acoustic guitar melodies and upbeat synths straight out of the 80s" and "a pleasant song and an admirable effort, but it’s a little too glossy and not quite catchy enough to achieve the anthemic heights for which it aims."

References

2011 singles
The Smashing Pumpkins songs
Songs written by Billy Corgan
Song recordings produced by Billy Corgan
2011 songs